Candoia bibroni australis, commonly known as the  Solomon Island tree boa, is a boa subspecies endemic to the Solomon Islands. Like all other boas, it is not venomous.

Description
Mature females are typically much larger than the males. Longevity is 10 years or more.

Geographic range
Found in the Solomon Islands.

The type locality given is "Nouvelle-Calédonie" (New Caledonia).

Feeding
The young will prey on small frogs and lizards, while adults will feed on larger prey such as smaller rodents.

References

External links
 

bibroni australis
Reptiles of the Solomon Islands